The Sabine is a cultivar of olives grown primarily in Corsica. In the Balagne region of Haute-Corse it is the main variety. The olive yields an exceptionally high amount of oil; more than 30%. Vulnerable to certain biological pests, it is relatively tolerant of cold. The Sabine olive variety should not be confused with the olive oil produced in the Sabina region of Italy.

Extent and synonyms
The Sabine is primarily grown in the Balagne region of Haute-Corse, where it is the main variety. It is known under a number of different names locally, including Aliva Bianca, Biancaghja and Capanacce.

Characteristics
It is a cultivar of middle strength, with a spreading growth form and elliptic leaves that are short and of medium width. The olives are of low weight, elongated shape and are slightly asymmetrical. The stone has a rounded apex and pointed base, with a smooth surface and the presence of a mucro. It is a late cultivar, and matures between January and mid-June.

Processing
The Sabine is used mainly for extraction of oil, and gives an extraordinarily high yield; under ideal circumstances as much as 30%. The aroma of the oil is described as "ripe and green fruit and hints of nuttiness".

Agronomy
It is considered a cultivar of good productivity, with good rooting ability, but with a tendency towards biennial bearing, i.e. that a good yield is followed by a weaker one the next year.

It has low resistance to certain biological pests, such as the Saissetia oleae and sooty moulds, and to a certain extent also the Bactrocera oleae (Olive fruit fly). On the other hand, it is quite tolerant of cold weather.

References

Olive cultivars